Lidor Cohen (born 16 December 1992) is an Israeli footballer who plays as a winger or a forward for Thai League 1 club Khon Kaen United, on loan from BG Pathum United.

References

External links
 

1992 births
Israeli Jews
Living people
Israeli footballers
Association football wingers
Maccabi Petah Tikva F.C. players
Beitar Jerusalem F.C. players
FC Dila Gori players
Hapoel Tel Aviv F.C. players
Liga Leumit players
Israeli Premier League players
Erovnuli Liga players
Lidor Cohen
Lidor Cohen
Footballers from Petah Tikva
Lidor Cohen
Israeli expatriate footballers
Expatriate footballers in Georgia (country)
Expatriate footballers in Thailand
Israeli expatriate sportspeople in Georgia (country)
Israeli expatriate sportspeople in Thailand